Viviana Mall is a shopping mall located in Thane West, Thane,
Maharashtra. Located on the Eastern Express Highway, it is well-connected with all areas of the city. It has a wide range of retail and entertainment outlets at the mall. Built on a 13-acre plot and spread over an area of 1.7 million sq ft, the mall has a leasable area of approx 1 million sq ft and also (Cinépolis) movie theatre. The mall has Fun City, which is an Arcade for kids to play. The mall has over 250 stores which comprises 19 large and mini anchors tenants.

Features
It is strategically located to cater to the catchments area of Thane, Mulund, Powai, Ghatkopar and other central suburbs of Mumbai. The mall is also easily accessible to the western suburbs of Mumbai via Powai. The mall also has a 900 KVA rooftop solar power plant built on its rooftop. This initiative has made it the first mall to generate 91,000 watts in a month through solar energy. It has over 250 leading brands in its prime retail and leisure space. The mall is India's first and only visually-impaired friendly mall and has launched “XRCVC-Viviana Extension” a resource centre for visually impaired.

Specialists 
With more than 250 brands, it calls itself a lifestyle mall that caters to all groups of people. It houses one of the largest multiplexes, Cinepolis, along with an arcade and play area called Funcity.

It has one of the largest multiplexes in India with Cinepolis, a megaplex with 14 screens and 19 large anchor tenants.

Awards
The mall has been named ‘The Best Retail Project of 2014’ across Mumbai Metropolitan Region (MMR) in an event held at Taj Palace, New Delhi.

In the same year, the mall also received two awards at the Asia Real Estate Awards 2014 namely ‘Retailer of the Year Award’ and ‘Impactful Design and Visual Merchandise Award’.

References

Shopping malls in Thane
Shopping malls established in 2013
2013 establishments in Maharashtra